Hatim Rida Jarrar is an Orthopedic Surgeon from Jenin, in the West Bank. He was elected as Mayor of the city, until he was arrested by the Israel Forces and spent 3 years in jail. After his release, he resigned from the position and went back to practice in his clinic in Jenin city. He is diagnosed with diabetes.

References

Mayors of Jenin
Living people
Year of birth missing (living people)